First Church of Christ, Scientist, Perth is a Christian Science church located at 264 St Georges Terrace, on the corner of Elder Street, in Perth, Western Australia.

History
Christian Science in Perth began in 1904 when several adherents arrived from Sydney and began meeting each week to read Bible lessons. The first public Christian Science service was held in 1908. By 1912 the group had formed the Christian Science Society, which subsequently became the First Church of Christ, Scientist, Perth in 1920. Services were held in a variety of rooms rented in Perth.

In 1926 the Church bought the site on the corner of St Georges Terrace and Elder Street (then George Street), which included several outbuildings of what had originally been the Pensioner Barracks. In 1933 an auditorium was built as a temporary church. The current church was built in 1939. It was not dedicated until 1949, because that ceremony could not be conducted until the church was debt-free.

The original harmonium was replaced in 1953 by a pipe organ, which was upgraded in 1983.

In 1966 "a significant portion" of the church's land was resumed by the government for the construction of the Mitchell Freeway. The 1933 auditorium (then being used as a Sunday school) was demolished; a replacement building, for both Sunday school and administration, was constructed just to the north of the church building. In that same year, toilets were added to the church.

Various other changes were made to the building in the late twentieth century, including addition of toilet facilities to the readers' rooms, security grilles over some windows, and replacement of the original asbestos roof with Colorbond steel.

Garden
When the church was built in 1939 the garden included tall, dark green pencil pines, and a strawberry tree. Lawn was planted in 1966 when the church gained more space in front, as a result of the realignment of roads as part of the freeway construction. In 1979 severe water restrictions in Perth, including a total sprinkler ban, prompted the removal of the pencil pines and lawn; they were replaced by Western Australian native plants that did not require watering. Most of the native garden  with the exception of three gum trees  was removed in 1999. The strawberry tree remains.

Heritage listings and awards

In 2001 the church was included in the Municipal Heritage Inventory for the City of Perth. In 2002 it was classified by the National Trust of Australia (WA), and in 2005 it was added to the State Register of Heritage Places.

The Art Deco Society of Western Australia has granted two awards to the church, recognising the architects Ochiltree & Hargrave for their design, and in 2002 for conservation and maintenance.

Services
As is the practice for Christian Science, services are held on Sundays, with testimony meetings on Wednesdays. Separate Sunday school sessions are held for children and teenagers.

The church has a reading room in Hay Street that provides library, bookshop and study facilities.

See also
 Church of Christ, Scientist

References

External links
 
 

20th-century Christian Science church buildings
Art Deco architecture in Western Australia
Churches in Perth, Western Australia
Churches completed in 1939
St Georges Terrace
State Register of Heritage Places in the City of Perth